Public Administration is a quarterly peer-reviewed academic journal which covers research, theory, and practice in public administration, public policy, public organization theory, and public management. It was established in 1923 and was ranked in the top of its field by a 1983 survey. In 2021, the journal was ranked as second in the field of public administration. One of its founders was the Liberal and later Labour statesman Richard Haldane (1st Viscount of Haldane), and the journal awards an annual prize in his honour to the most distinguished practitioner essay published in Public Administration in that year. The journal is published by Wiley (publisher) and is edited by Bruce D. McDonald, III (North Carolina State University).

According to the Journal Citation Reports, the journal has a 2021 impact factor of 4.013, ranking it 31st out of 187 journals in the category "Political Science" and 11th out of 49 journals in the category "Public Administration".

History 
Public Administration was established by the Royal Institute of Public Administration in 1922. When the first issue of the journal was published in 1923, it was published under the banner of the Journal of Public Administration. The aim of the journal was to publish news and research from the field of public administration in order to improve the "efficiency of public services, and the efficiency of public servants." Initially, the journal was edited by state of the Institute, though the journal elected Norman Chester from Nuffield College, Oxford as its first academic editor-in-chief in 1943. After the Institute's closure in 1992, the journal's editor approached Blackwell Publishers about taking over ownership and distribution of the journal to prevent its closure. Currently, the journal is the official journal of the public administration section of the American Political Science Association.

Editors-in-chief 
The following persons have been editors-in-chief:

Abstracting and Indexing
Public Administration is indexed in:
 Social Sciences Citation Index
 Scopus
 Inspec
 InfoTrac
 GEOBASE
 ABI/INFORM Collection

See also 
 List of political science journals
 List of public administration journals

References

External links 
 

Public administration journals
Quarterly journals
English-language journals
Publications established in 1923
Wiley-Blackwell academic journals